The savanna shrew (Crocidura fulvastra) is a species of mammal in the family Soricidae. It is found in Benin, Burkina Faso, Cameroon, Central African Republic, Chad, Democratic Republic of the Congo, Djibouti, Eritrea, Ethiopia, Kenya, Mali, Mauritania, Niger, Nigeria, Sudan, and Uganda. Its natural habitat is dry savanna.

References
 Hutterer, R. & Jenkins, P. 2004.  Crocidura fulvastra.   2006 IUCN Red List of Threatened Species.   Downloaded on 30 July 2007.

Crocidura
Mammals described in 1843
Taxonomy articles created by Polbot